Girl in a Wetsuit is a life-size 1972 bronze sculpture by Elek Imredy of a woman in a wetsuit, located on a rock in the water along the north side of Stanley Park, Vancouver, British Columbia, Canada.

Description
The bronze sculpture depicts a friend of Imredy's, Debra Harrington, in a wetsuit with flippers on her feet and a mask on her forehead. Although some believe it was a replica of Copenhagen's The Little Mermaid, the creator has said:

See also
 1972 in art

References

External links 
 

Monuments and memorials in Vancouver
1972 sculptures
Bronze sculptures in Canada
Outdoor sculptures in Vancouver
Sculptures of women in Canada
Stanley Park
Statues in Canada